The following are the national records in athletics in Switzerland maintained by its national athletics federation: Swiss Athletics (SA).

Outdoor
Key to tables:

+ = en route to a longer distance

Mx = mark was made in a mixed race

Men

Women

Indoor

Men

Women

Notes

References
General
Swiss Records and Best Performances – Outdoor 18 January 2023 updated
Swiss Records and Best Performances – Indoor 1 March 2023 updated
Specific

External links
SA web site 

Switzerland
Records
Athletics
Athletics